E. Gluck Corporation is an American watch manufacturer headquartered in Little Neck, New York. It was founded in 1956 by Eugen Gluck. E. Gluck Corporation manufactures watches under two flagship proprietary brands, Armitron and Torgoen. The company also manufactures watches for major fashion brands, including: Anne Klein, Nine West, Juicy Couture, Vince Camuto, Badgley Mischka and Joseph Abboud. As of 1999, Armitron had the fifth largest share of all watch purchases, by brand, in the United States. As of 2005, Armitron ranks as one of the top ten fine and fashion watch brands in the US, along with Timex, Fossil, Seiko, Citizen, Casio, Guess, Bulova, Movado, and Pulsar.

Divisions

Armitron

 Men's Dress Watches
 Men's Sport Watches
 Ladies' Dress Watches
 Themed-dials
 Ladies' Sport Watches
Armitron is a medium-price watch manufacturing company which manufactures and retails watches in the U.S. only.

Brands
 Anne Klein
 Anne Klein NY
 Armitron
 Badgley Mischka
 JLO By Jennifer Lopez
 Nine West

Major categories

Digital watches
Armitron started making digital watches in the 1970s with LED displays. The LED displays consumed so much battery life that, in 1977, the company stopped production. Armitron subsequently began manufacturing their digital watches with LCD displays, which eventually became the industry standard.

Automatic movements 
In 2007, Armitron began manufacturing automatic watches.

Notable marketing efforts 
 Clock sponsor at Yankee Stadium.

References

Watch brands
Watchmaking conglomerates
Manufacturing companies established in 1956
Companies based in Queens, New York
Manufacturing companies based in New York City
Watch manufacturing companies of the United States
Privately held companies based in New York City
1956 establishments in New York (state)